Abdul Azeez Kolawole Adeyemo (June 14, 1941 – March 12, 2002), popularly known as 'Alhaji how are you', was a Nigerian and prominent Yoruba politician. He was born in Ado-Ekiti the Ekiti State capital to Sir. Rufai Adeyemo & Princess Adebolarin Agunsoye. Growing up as a Catholic during the British colonial era, he later converted to Islam. He became a politician early in his career. He joined the Western Region campaign of Egbe Omo Oduduwa founded by Chief Jeremiah Obafemi Awolowo. He was also a front-line member of Action Group political party which later metamorphosed into Unity Party of Nigeria. His main legacy was to secure democracy and good governance in post independent Nigeria.

Background and political life

A clergy, a painter, a successful business man, and an orator who assumed his first political office in the Second Republic as a Member of Parliament on October 1, 1979, when Alhaji Shehu Shagari was sworn in as the first civilian President and Commander-in-Chief of the Federal Republic of Nigeria. The government was later removed from power on New Year's Eve 1983 by Major General Muhammadu Buhari.

Alhaji A.A.K Adeyemo played a significant role as a Campaign Manager in the victory of the short lived government of Evangelist Bamidele Olumilua, Governor of old Ondo State  from 1991 to 1993 under the umbrella of the Social Democratic Party (Nigeria). He later served in that administration as the Ondo State Parliamentary Co-ordinator & Liaison Officer. The biggest problem that clogged the wheel of Nigeria's ride to social, economic and political self-actualization was epitomised by Military President Ibrahim Babangida's annulment of the June 12, 1993, presidential polls won by Chief Moshood Kashimawo Olawale Abiola in a free and fair election. The annulment coupled with the dissolution of the political parties invariably led to the demise of the civilian government in all individual states across the Federal Republic of Nigeria. Once again, the Nigerian dream of a democratic sovereignty to which 'how are you' remained absolutely committed was cut short in a carapace of indifference and cynicism; justice was debased to tokenism and cynical symbolism.

Elder statesman

Alhaji Adeyemo was also a renowned leader of the PAN Yoruba Elders Consultative  Forum popularly known as 'Afenifere'. He was also instrumental in the creation of Ekiti State in October 1996. Following the restoration of democracy in the late 1990s shortly after the sudden and mysterious death of the military dictator General Sani Abacha, Alhaji Adeyemo continued to be politically active and assumed the status of a 'Godfather' owing to his sphere of influence across the political terrain and oligarchy. This was demonstrated by his unquestionable role in the political aspiration of Otunba Adeniyi Adebayo as first Governor elect, Ekiti State, under the platform of the Alliance for Democracy (Nigeria), in 1999.

A shortlist of his political alliances includes Samuel Adekunle Ajasin JP, Alhaji Shehu Musa Yar'Adua, Alhaji Baba Gana Kingibe, Chief Olu Falae, General Adeyinka Adebayo, Evangelist Bamidele Olumilua, Olusegun Kokumo Agagu, Alhaji Abdulkadir Balarabe Musa, Pa Abraham Adesanya, T.Y Danjuma, Alhaji Bamanga Tukur, Otunba Reuben Famuyibo, Adebayo Adefarati, Ebenezer Babatope, and Chief Bola Ige amongst others.

Demise

'Alhaji how are you' died in hospital on March 12, 2002, after being rushed to hospital following a protracted high blood pressure resulting from a long-standing cardiovascular disease.

References

Yoruba politicians
Nigerian former Christians
1941 births
2002 deaths
Converts to Islam from Roman Catholicism
Nigerian Muslims
Nigerian Ahmadis
People from Ekiti State